Omar Ali Abdillahi is a Somali politician. He was appointed as the Minister of Health of Somaliland on 14 April 2019.

See also

 Peace, Unity, and Development Party
 Ministry of Health (Somaliland)
 List of Somalis

References

People from Hargeisa
Peace, Unity, and Development Party politicians
Somaliland politicians
Health ministers of Somaliland
Living people
Government ministers of Somaliland
Year of birth missing (living people)